Kristofer Bubic (born August 19, 1997) is an American professional baseball pitcher for the Kansas City Royals of Major League Baseball (MLB).

Amateur career
Bubic attended Archbishop Mitty High School in San Jose, California, where he played football and baseball, and he graduated in 2015. As a junior, he was 8–2 with a 0.89 ERA, and as a senior, he compiled a 1.20 ERA and struck out 82 batters in 70 innings pitched. He was not drafted out of high school in the 2015 Major League Baseball draft and he enrolled at Stanford University where he played college baseball for the Stanford Cardinal.

Bubic's father Mladen hails from Zemunik in Croatia.

As a freshman at Stanford in 2016, Bubic was 0–3 with a 3.26 ERA in 21 games (six starts). In 2017, as a sophomore, he started 15 games and posted a 7–6 record and 2.79 ERA with 96 strikeouts in 90 innings. After the season, he played in the Cape Cod Baseball League for the Yarmouth–Dennis Red Sox, earning Pitcher of the Year honors after going 4–1 with a 1.65 ERA in  innings. As a junior in 2018, he went 8–1 with a 2.62 ERA and was named to the Pac-12 All-Conference Team.

Professional career
Bubic was drafted 40th overall by the Kansas City Royals in the 2018 Major League Baseball draft and he signed with the Royals on June 18 for $1,597,500. He made his professional debut with the Idaho Falls Chukars where he was named a Pioneer League All-Star. In ten starts for Idaho Falls, Bubic posted a 2–3 record with a 4.03 ERA. Bubic began 2019 with the Lexington Legends. After pitching to a 4–1 record with a 2.08 ERA in nine starts, he was promoted to the Wilmington Blue Rocks. Over 17 starts with Wilmington, he went 7–4 with a 2.30 ERA. Bubic was named to the 2019 All-Star Futures Game.

Bubic made his major league debut on July 31, 2020, against the Chicago White Sox, pitching four innings while allowing three earned runs and striking out three. With the 2020 Kansas City Royals, Bubic made ten starts, compiling a 1–6 record with 4.32 ERA and 49 strikeouts over fifty innings pitched.

In 2021 he was 6–7 with an ERA of 4.43.

In 2022 he was 3–13 with an ERA of 5.58 in 129 innings, as he had the worst OBP-against among major league pitchers, at .381, the highest WHIP (1.70), gave up the highest percentage of line drives (25.8%), and gave up the most walks per nine innings among major league pitchers (4.4).

References

External links

Stanford Cardinal bio

1997 births
Living people
American people of Croatian descent
Baseball players from San Jose, California
Major League Baseball pitchers
Kansas City Royals players
Stanford Cardinal baseball players
Idaho Falls Chukars players
Lexington Legends players
Wilmington Blue Rocks players
Yarmouth–Dennis Red Sox players
Omaha Storm Chasers players